Stefan Härtel (born 6 February 1988) is a German professional boxer who held the European super-middleweight title in 2019. As an amateur, Härtel represented Germany at the 2012 Olympics, reaching the quarter-finals of the middleweight bracket.

Amateur career

World Amateur Boxing Championship results 
2011
Defeated  Adem Kılıççı 13-10
Defeated  Jaba Khositashvili 22-6
Lost to  Ryōta Murata 15-18

Olympic Games results 
2012
Defeated  Enrique Collazo 18-10
Defeated  Darren O'Neill 19-12
Lost to  Anthony Ogogo 10-15

Professional boxing record

References

External links

1988 births
Living people
People from Lauchhammer
People from Bezirk Cottbus
German male boxers
Sportspeople from Brandenburg
Olympic boxers of Germany
Boxers at the 2012 Summer Olympics
Middleweight boxers